Orange Grove Court is a bungalow court located at 745 East Orange Grove Blvd. in Pasadena, California. The court, which was built in 1924, contains twelve single-family houses arranged along a central walkway. The houses were designed in the Mission Revival style and feature arched porches and windows, stucco exteriors, and tile roofs. A double arch is located at the end of the walkway, a variation on the common practice of placing another home at the end of the walkway in a bungalow court. According to its National Register of Historic Places nomination, the court "epitomizes the concept of the Southern California bungalow court" due to its layout and Mission Revival details.

References

External links

Bungalow courts
Houses in Pasadena, California
Houses completed in 1924
Houses on the National Register of Historic Places in California
National Register of Historic Places in Pasadena, California
Mission Revival architecture in California